is a railway station in Miyazaki City, Miyazaki Prefecture, Japan.

Lines

Layout 
The station consists of an island platform serving two tracks with a siding. The station building is timber structure in western style which houses a waiting area and SUGOCA card reader. Access to the island platform is by means of a footbridge.

Adjacent stations

History
On 25 October 1916, the track at Kiyotake was linked up with the track from Aoidake. Miyazaki Prefectural Railway was nationalized. JGR designated the track to Miyazaki as part of the Miyazaki Line and later, on 21 September 1917, the Miyazaki Main Line. On 15 December 1923, the entire stretch of track from Shigeoka through Miyazaki to Yoshimatsu, including Kiyotake, was designated as part of the Nippō Main Line. With the privatization of Japanese National Railways (JNR), the successor of JGR, on 1 April 1987, Kiyotake came under the control of JR Kyushu.

Passenger statistics
In fiscal 2016, the station was used by an average of 520 passengers daily (boarding passengers only), and it ranked 243rd among the busiest stations of JR Kyushu.

See also
List of railway stations in Japan

References

External links
Kiyotake (JR Kyushu)

Railway stations in Miyazaki Prefecture
Railway stations in Japan opened in 1915